Collagen alpha-1(XXI) chain is a protein that in humans is encoded by the COL21A1 gene. The protein is an extracellular matrix component of blood vessel walls, secreted by smooth-muscle cells. The protein may contribute to the extracellular matrix assembly of the vascular network during blood vessel formation.

References 

Collagens